Anneliese Müller (8 August 1911 – 5 April 2011) was a German operatic alto and mezzo-soprano.

Life 
Müller began her artistic career in the choir of the Stadttheater Halberstadt. There she got a contract as a soloist in 1939. In 1945 she changed to the Staatsoper Berlin. At the reopening of the house after the Second World War she sang the title role in Gluck's Orfeo ed Euridice. Later she was appointed Kammersängerin. She left the stage in 1966.

Filmography 
 1949: The Marriage of Figaro (vocal synchronization)

Operas 
 1954: Richard Wagner: Die Meistersinger von Nürnberg (Magdalena) – director: Wolf Völker (Deutsche Staatsoper Berlin)
 1955: Alban Berg: Wozzeck –director: Werner Kelch (Deutsche Staatsoper Berlin)
 1956: Richard Wagner: Die Walküre – director: Erich Witte (Deutsche Staatsoper Berlin)
 1957: Richard Wagner: Das Rheingold (Rheintochter) – director: Erich Witte (Deutsche Staatsoper Berlin)
 1958: Sergei Prokofiev: Die Verlobung im Kloster (Duenna) – director: Erich-Alexander Winds (Deutsche Staatsoper Berlin)
 1958: Giacomo Puccini: Madama Butterfly (Suzuki) – director: Peter Neitsch (Deutsche Staatsoper Berlin)
 1961: Kurt Schwaen: Leonce und Lena (Gouvernante) – director: Erich-Alexander Winds (Deutsche Staatsoper Berlin – Apollosaal)

References

Further reading 
 Karl-Josef Kutsch, Leo Riemens: Großes Sängerlexikon. Munich: Saur, 1997, .

External links 

 

German contraltos
German operatic mezzo-sopranos
20th-century German women opera singers
1911 births
2011 deaths